Allium altaicum is a species of onion native to Asiatic Russia (Altay, Buryatiya, Zabaykalsky Krai, Irkutsk, Tuva, Amur Oblast), Mongolia, Kazakhstan and northern China (Inner Mongolia, Heilongjiang and Xinjiang).

Description
Ovary is egg-shaped; stamens longer than the tepals.

References

altaicum
Onions
Flora of temperate Asia
Plants described in 1773
Taxa named by Peter Simon Pallas